Lizo Mzimba (born 6 December 1968) is an English journalist and television presenter. He is best known for being a presenter for Newsround between 1998 and 2008 and is currently the Entertainment Correspondent for BBC News.

Early life
Mzimba attended the independent Solihull School (during which time he was also leader of the Birmingham Schools' Symphony Orchestra) and The University of Birmingham.  Whilst at Birmingham he was a member of the student TV station, winning awards at NaSTA (National Student Television Association). By 1991 he was contributing to Sounds magazine.

Career
Mzimba was one of the longest-serving presenters, a reporter and an assistant producer for CBBC's Newsround between 1998 and 2008.

In 2003, Mzimba hosted a televised interview with J. K. Rowling and Steve Kloves about the 2002 film Harry Potter and the Chamber of Secrets.

In 2008, Mzimba became the BBC News Entertainment Correspondent. Along with the traditional BBC News bulletins and the News Channel, he has also appeared on BBC Breakfast.  Mzimba has also appeared as himself on The Sarah Jane Adventures.

References

External links

All about Lizo - CBBC Newsround

Living people
BBC newsreaders and journalists
Black British television personalities
English television presenters
Newsround presenters
People educated at Solihull School
Alumni of the University of Birmingham
Year of birth missing (living people)